Villemaury is a commune in the department of Eure-et-Loir, north-central France. The municipality was established on 1 January 2017 by merger of the former communes of Saint-Cloud-en-Dunois (the seat), Civry, Lutz-en-Dunois and Ozoir-le-Breuil.

See also 
Communes of the Eure-et-Loir department

References 

Communes of Eure-et-Loir